Bangladesh Agricultural University (Bangladesh Krishi Bishshobiddalôe), abbreviated as BAU, was established  in 1961. The university has 43 departments.

BAU was the second highest budgeted public university in Bangladesh for the year 2013–2014. It is ranked number one university of Bangladesh according to the webometrics university ranking 2017.BAU has been ranked 2nd in the Bangladesh in the Times higher education world university ranking 2022.

Campus
The campus is made up of academic, administrative and residential buildings and l farms, gardens and other related facilities.

Two national research institutes, Bangladesh Institute of Nuclear Agriculture (BINA) and Bangladesh Fisheries Research Institute (BFRI) are housed in this campus.

Infrastructure
 Two administrative buildings
 Six faculty complexes
 Thirteen halls for students
 three-storied central library
 modern auditorium (Shilpacharya Zainul Abedin Auditorium, 2,000 seats)
 conference hall
 central laboratory
 Research field for every faculty
 gymnasium
 stadium
 sports complex
 healthcare centre (free care service for students, university staff and their families)
 project complex
 657 units of residential facilities for teachers, officers and employees
 TSC
 Botanical garden
 Fish museum & Biodiversity centre
 Agriculture museum
 GTI complex
 Computer lab & wifi zone
 Horticulture farm
 Agriculture university school & college
 Farmer auditorium
 Community centre
 Guest house
 Central mosque
 Bank & ATM booth
 KR market

Halls of residence (student dormitories)

Boys' halls
 Isha Khan Hall
 Shahjalal Hall
 Shaheed Shamsul Haque Hall
 Shaheed Nazmul Ahsan Hall
 Ashraful Haque Hall
 Shaheed Jamal Hossain Hall
 Hossain Shaheed Shuhrawardy Hall
 Fazlul Haque Hall
 Bangabandhu Sheikh Mujib Hall

Girls' halls
 Sultana Razia Hall
 Taposhi Rabeya Hall
 Sheikh Fazilatunnesa Mujib hall
 Begum Rokeya Hall

Administration
Partial list of the vice-chancellors of the university:

List of Vice-Chancellors 
 M Osman Ghani (2 September 1961 – 1963)
 S.D. Chaudhuri (1963 – 1973)
 Quazi Mohammad Fazlur Rahim (January 1971 – July 1971 and January 1972 – November 1973)
 Mosleh Uddin Ahmed Chowdhury (24 November 1973 – October 1980)
 AKM Aminul Haque (1980 – 1988)
 Kamaluddin Ahmad
 Mohammad Hossain (14 November 1996 – 5 February 2000)
 (18th) M Musharraf Hossain Mian (2006 – )
 Md. Akhtar Hossain ( – October 2008)
 MA Sattar Mandal (15 November 2008 –)
 (22nd) Rafiqul Haque (11 August 2011 – 8 April 2015)
 (23rd) Md. Ali Akbar (24 May 2015 – 23 May 2019)
 (24th) Lutful Hassan (30 May 2019 – present)

Faculty and departments
There are 45 departments under 6 faculties.

Faculty of Veterinary Science
Veterinary Science faculty is the leading faculty of the university which established in 1961 . This faculty has gifted quality Veterinarian for the country and contributed in animal reproduction to enhance profitability in farm level. The graduates are working in reproduction & Production diversified field (Farm Animals, Pet Animals, Avian and wildlife) of livestock by applying knowledge of clinical science like Theriogenology, Obstetrics, clinical physiology, pathology. Veterinarians has huge scope in research organization, commercial breeder farms, agro industries, milk and meat processing industries, private clinics. Along with these, Faculty of Veterinary Science is contributing on research for diseases, zoonoses, health improvements, livestock reproductive health and development. Besides, this faculty  has huge contribution in poultry and dairy industry.           
 Department of Anatomy and Histology
 Department of Physiology
 Department of Microbiology and Hygiene
 Department of Pharmacology
 Department of Parasitology
 Department of Pathology
 Department of Medicine

Department of Surgery and Obstetrics
Degree offered by the faculty-
 Doctor of Veterinary Medicine (DVM)
 Master's of Science.
 PhD

Faculty of Agriculture
The Faculty of Agriculture was established in 1961. It has the following departments:
 Department of Soil Science
 Department of Entomology
 Department of Horticulture
 Department of Plant Pathology
 Department of Crop Botany
 Department of Genetics and Plant Breeding
 Department of Agricultural Extension Education
 Department of Agricultural Chemistry
 Department of Biochemistry and Molecular Biology
 Department of Physics
 Department of Chemistry
 Department of Languages
 Department of Agroforestry
 Department of Biotechnology
 Department of Environmental Science
 Department of Seed Science and Technology
 Department of Food Safety and management
 Currently the faculty of Animal Husbandry is offering the following degree programs:
 B.Sc. Ag. (Hons)
 M.S.
 Ph.D.

Faculty of Agricultural Engineering and Technology
 Department of Farm Structure and Environmental Engineering
 Department of Farm Power and Machinery
 Department of Irrigation and Water Management
 Department of Food Technology and Rural Industries
 Department of Computer Science and Mathematics

Faculty of Animal Husbandry
Faculty of Animal Husbandry at Bangladesh Agricultural University was established in 1962.
 Department of Animal Breeding and Genetics
 Department of Animal Science
 Department of Animal Nutrition
 Department of Poultry Science
 Department of Dairy Science

Currently the faculty of Animal Husbandry is offering the following degree programs:
 B.Sc. A.H. (Hons)
 M.S.
 Ph.D.

Faculty of Agricultural Economics and Rural Sociology
 Department of Agricultural Economics
 Department of Agricultural Finance
 Department of Agricultural Statistics
 Department of Agribusiness and Marketing
 Department of Rural Sociology

Faculty of Fisheries
 Department of Fisheries, Biology and Genetics
 Department of Aquaculture
 Department of Fisheries Management
 Department of Fisheries Technology
 Department of Marine Fisheries

Admissions

Undergraduate programme
Undergraduate admissions in BAU are competitive. Admission related information is available on this website . After completion of HSC (Higher Secondary School Certificate) education, a student can submit his/her application for undergraduate admission if they fulfill the minimum requirements. A candidate is eligible to apply for admission into Level 1, Semester 1 of undergraduate studies as offered by six faculties of BAU for the year 2017 must have passed SSC (Science group) or equivalent examination in 2013 or 2014 and HSC (Science group) or equivalent examination in 2015 or 2016 with a total of 9.0 GPA.

As of 2016–2017 session, the general distribution of seats for admission into Level 1, Semester 1 of the undergraduate courses as offered by six faculties BAU will be as follows:
 Faculty of Veterinary Science: 191
 Faculty of Agriculture( Agriculture- 402 + Food Safety Management- 30): 432
 Faculty of Animal Husbandry: 191
 Faculty of Agricultural Economics & Rural Sociology: 133
 Faculty of Agricultural Engineering & Technology  (B.Sc. Agri. Engg. 100 + B.Sc. Food Engg. 50): 150
 Faculty of Fisheries: 133
This is including all Freedom fighters quota and other quotas.

Total enrollment per year = 1230.

Bangladeshi all Agriculture University association has decided that undergraduate admission test will be combined from academic session 2019–2020. After admission test merit list, students will admit according to the merit score of seven Agriculture University. All seven Agriculture University has available seats 3551 including Bangladesh Agriculture University.

MS/PhD program
M.S. and PhD programs are available as follows:
 Faculty of Veterinary Science: Anatomy & Histology, Microbiology & Hygiene, Parasitology, Medicine, Pathology, Physiology, Pharmacology, and Surgery & Obstetrics.
 Faculty of Agriculture: Agronomy, Soil Science, Crop Botany, Plant Pathology, Horticulture, Entomology, Agricultural Extension Education, Agricultural Chemistry, Biochemistry and Molecular Biology, Genetics & Plant Breeding, Physics, Chemistry, Languages, Agroforestry, Biotechnology and Environmental Science.
 Faculty of Animal Husbandry: Animal Breeding & Genetics, Animal Nutrition, Animal Science, Poultry Science, and Dairy Science.
 Faculty of Agricultural Economics & Rural Sociology: Agricultural Economics, Cooperation & Marketing, Agricultural Finance, Agricultural Statistics, and Rural Sociology.
 Faculty of Agricultural Engineering & Technology: Irrigation & Water Management, Farm Power & Machinery, Farm Structure, Food Technology & Rural Industries and Computer Science & Mathematics.
 Faculty of Fisheries: Fisheries Biology & Genetics, Aquaculture, Fisheries Management, and Fisheries Technology.

Admission of foreign students
In the case of foreign nationals, applicants must have completed 12 years of schooling and passed courses equivalent to HSC (science group) of Bangladesh with Physics, Chemistry, Mathematics and Biology and obtained equivalent GPA. An applicant has to produce certified academic transcript showing that he/she has studied and passed courses equivalent to HSC (science group) of Bangladesh having Physics, Chemistry, Mathematics, Biology and English in his/her curricula.

Research
BAU conducts two main streams of research — degree research and project research — the former being supervised by the teachers for postgraduate students at M.S. and PhD levels while the problem-solving research projects are conducted with sponsorship accorded either by the university or external funding agencies. The Committee for Advanced Studies and Research (C.A.S.R.) is responsible for co-ordinating both streams.

For co-ordination and management of research projects, BAU Research System (BAURES) was established in 1984. Since its establishment, BAURES has completed 322 research projects and has 112 ongoing projects. The ongoing research projects are funded by International Atomic Energy Agency (IAEA), Department for International Development (DfID) of UK, Norwegian Agency for International Development (NORAD), International Foundation for Science (IFS), etc.

Publications
The Journal of the Bangladesh Agricultural University (ISSN 1810-3030) is published in June and December on behalf of the Bangladesh Agricultural University Research System (BAURES). Original research papers, review articles and short communications are published.

Bilateral collaborations
The United States Agency for International Development (USAID), through a contract with the Texas A&M University, provides to the university support in the form of advisory services, fellowships and equipment. Development support was made available through two IDA credit agreements signed between the government and the World Bank in 1964 and 1966. Over the years the university has received research support from international sources including USAID, International Development Association, International Development Research Centre, UNICEF, Ford Foundation, International Labour Organization, Danish International Development Agency, Canadian International Development Agency, and International Atomic Energy Agency.

The university receives funding support from Department for International Development, Food and Agriculture Organization, International Rice Research Institute, European Union, United States Department of Agriculture, Global Environment Facility and the Ghent University through bi- and multilateral research projects.

The university signed five memoranda of understanding with the Texas A&M University, Richard Stockton College of New Jersey, Florida A&M University, Brooklyn College and Research Foundation of the City University of New York, and Ghent University of Belgium.

The university has linkage programs with national organisations like Rural Development Academy, Bangladesh Public Administration Training Centre, and organisations from the National Agricultural Research System (NARS) in the fields of research, training and extension.

Alumni
 M. Golam Shahi Alam, veterinarian and university administrator
 Goutam Buddha Das, animal nutritionist and university administrator
 M. Afzal Hossain, biochemist and university administrator
 Md. Tofazzal Islam, biotechnologist
 Mohammad Abdur Razzaque, Minister of Agriculture since 2019
 Shawkat Momen Shahjahan, MP for Tangail-8 (1986-1988, 1999-2001, and 2008-2014)

Gallery

See also
 Bangladesh University of Textiles

References

External links

 Official BAU website
 Bangladesh Institute of Nuclear Agriculture
 Bangladesh Fisheries Research Institute
 

 
Agricultural universities and colleges in Bangladesh
Educational institutions established in 1961
Public universities of Bangladesh
1961 establishments in East Pakistan